is a romance anime produced by Toei Animation and aired between February 2, 2003 and January 25, 2004 on ANN. In 2009, William Winckler Productions produced two all-new English-dubbed movie versions edited from the original series. Producer William Winckler, known for Tekkaman: The Space Knight, wrote, produced and directed the English films, which are seen on broadband in Japan. A manga version, written by Izumi Todo and drawn by Yui Ayumi, was serialized by Kodansha in the manga magazine Nakayoshi from March 2003 to February 2004, and collected in two bound volumes.

A sequel novel was announced on August 3, 2017, and released on September 12, 2017.

Plot
Nadja is an orphan who lives at the Applefield Orphanage, in early 20th-century England. Nadja is called by Miss Appleton, the orphanage's owner, to receive a package delivered to her. The gifts sent for her thirteenth birthday are a dress and a diary. She is told in the accompanying letter that her mother is still alive. She later joins a traveling street performance act called the Dandelion Troupe in search of her mother after a fire breaks out in her orphanage. She travels the world, finding many friends along the way that teach her things about herself, ultimately having to learn the truth about her parentage and discovering her own destiny.

Characters

Dandelion Troupe

Nadja Applefield is a Franco-Austrian sunny, charming girl, with a talent for dancing and making friends wherever she goes. Even though she is very young, she shoulders responsibility quite well, often taking care of the younger children at the orphanage. On the other hand, she is impulsive to the point of foolhardiness and extremely trusting, which leads others to take easy advantage of her and even abuse her thoroughly, if the right buttons are pressed. Her biggest dream is to someday be reunited with her mother.

Nadja was given to Miss Applefield to raise when she was a baby, her only possession at the time being an elaborated heart-shaped brooch. Nadja grew up at the orphanage believing her parents were dead; in the days before her 13th birthday, Nadja received a surprising gift in the mail: a trunk containing a ball gown and diary, both keepsakes belonging to her birth mother. The gown was worn by Nadja's mother at her first ball, and the diary was her mother's colorful description of all the people she met and danced with at that ball. Nadja is amazed by this gift, and stunned to discover that her mother might actually be alive out there somewhere. When bad men arrive to steal the brooch away from Nadja, she leaves the Applefield orphanage and begins a career as a dancer with the travelling Dandelion Troupe. Her true date of birth is unknown, even by Nadja herself, but she claims it to be on July 25.

In the last quarter of the series, she departs for England leaving Dandelion Troupe to look for witnesses to testify her identity, after finding out that her former friend Rosemary was impersonating her and was spending time with her mother. Early in the series, she meets the Harcourt twins, Francis and Keith. She initially feels attached to Francis and once mistook Keith for Francis. Halfway through the series, she seems to be falling in love with Keith, as Francis tells him, even though she doesn't confess or seems unaware of her true feelings.  She is ultimately forced to choose between them romantically. Near the end of the series, she chooses Francis over Keith because she thought that he was the first person to help her. Indeed, the first person to help her was Keith. Since she is confused about her feelings, she chooses Francis, but later comes to realize the one that she loves is Keith. Francis is the one that make her realize it. At the end, she did not choose either one and re-joined the Dandelion Troupe. It is hinted that she will make another decision. Interestingly, she is very popular among the males of the show, with Francis, Keith, Christian, Kennosuke, Oliver, TJ, and Fernando all developing crushes on her.

George is vigorous and trusting; his co-workers often call him 'Dancho' ("master") due to his leadership skills. He is the unofficial head of the Dandelion Troupe and a good friend to Raphael, the free-spirited troubador. George is the "gentle strongman" and leader of the Dandelion Troupe; the car they all travel in appears to belong to him, and he is the one who decides where they will travel to next.

George is gruff and macho, but he has his weaknesses as well. He is extremely superstitious and addicted to treasure hunting, and cannot turn down maps offered to him. His treasure hunting passion has dragged the Troupe off course in their travels several times. It is unclear if his treasure hunting exploits have actually yielded treasure, but George is always keen on going after the next treasure on the horizon.

 / 

A mysterious, kindly Russian old lady who makes extravagant hats or hair ornaments for dukes and nobles. She knitted a dress for Nadja as soon as she tried to join the troupe (as well as other dancing outfits for her and Kennosuke), and it is likely that she is the primary source of income for the Dandelion Troupe, along with donations.

Anna is a very mysterious character: she is sort of a grandmotherly figure for everyone in the Troupe, yet none of them are really sure just how old she is. Anna sews all the costumes for the Troupe (though it seems that Nadja and Kennosuke are the only ones who occasionally change costume) and she operates the phonograph mounted on the top of the car. She's also very good at handling money, always getting discounts and lower prices.

Anna has a side business of making fashionable hats for noblewomen, and occasionally the Dandelion car must detour so Anna can deliver a hat to a buyer. In fact, Nadja and Francis meet each other thanks to Anna delivering a hat for Francis' aunt, Emma. Anna is a fortune teller; she know right away after she first sees Nadja that fate has adventures in store for her, and throughout the series she always seems to know when important things will happen to Nadja. She is an unexpectedly good fighter, due to her small size and skill with her deadly iron pan. Although celebrated in one of the episodes, Anna's birthday is never mentioned, but it's supposedly at the same day as Nadja's unknown yet true birthday, as her mother celebrates it at that same day.

The French singer for the Dandelion Troupe. Somewhat of a skeptical and exigent lady when it comes to performing abilities, she takes kindly to Nadja when she proves her worth as a performer, and takes her under her wing openly in France. Sylvie is the "songbird" of the Dandelion Troupe; her beautiful voice and sexy looks captivate her audience wherever she goes. Sylvie is sort of an older sister figure for Nadja while they are on the road, good at giving Nadja advice, and is someone Nadja can turn to with her emotional problems.

Sylvie can be frivolous at times; she's vain about her looks, likes going shopping, like other girls her age, and at one point she is seen dating Antonio Fabiani, a very shady character. But she also has romantic problems of her own; she suffers an unrequited love for Raphael, a traveling musician and friend of the Dandelion Troupe, who currently cannot correspond her feelings due to his past. Sylvie is also a good fighter, thanks to her ability to use her umbrella as a weapon.

Abel is German and works as the Pierrot of the Troupe, in charge of comedy and laughter. He wears clown make-up while on stage, and performs all kinds of amusing antics such as juggling, acrobatics and standing on a large ball. Even though he is the Pierrot, Abel can be very serious and wise at times. He is a very well-educated man, somewhat of a scholar and mentor figure; he helps Nadja to look for books in libraries and reads her mother's diary, which is written in German, a language Nadja does not know since she has been raised in England.

Behind Abel's Pierrot make-up lies a sad past and a family he had to leave behind; he was the doctor of an impoverished village, but spent a time in jail after stealing medicine from an hospital to save his patients from an epidemic and had to abandon his family after his release, since his son Stefan had the illness and was left in a wheelchair.

A gentle Irish musician, Thomas plays the violin for the Dandelion Troupe. He is very quiet and very talented and dedicated to his music; one of the times Thomas really gets angry is when someone insults his music and his playing, like genius pianist John Whittard does. Thomas gives Nadja her first dancing prop: a baton of sorts that has a matching castagnet that attaches to one end, and a belled piece that attaches to the other end.

Another thing about Thomas is his practicality; he is gentle and quiet, but he is very down to earth when it comes to day-to-day life, becoming concerned about how the Troupe earns money and the success of their performances. He is rather cowardly when faced with violence and physical danger, and at those times Abel and Sylvie give him alcohol to make him overcome his fear.

A descendant of samurais, Kennosuke set off to Europe from Japan after being orphaned, determined to get money for himself and his sister Hanako. His dream is to become either a good samurai or an aviator, since one of his first bosses in Japan was a dreamy inventor who wanted to fly. In England, he sneaks into the Dandelion Troupe's car and accidentally sets a whole disaster, but is forgiven and joins the company.

On stage, he usually performs dance and/or fighting sequences with his bokken (wooden sword), and occasionally joins Nadja in her own dance acts. He has a crush on Nadja, usually portrayed as a running gag more than a serious issue; whatever the source of those feelings is, he always acts as her best friend. He is a very skilled mechanic who maintains the Dandelion Troupe's car.

A very young Italian girl, who is a mute. She communicates with Nadja and Kennosuke quite easily, regardless.

Rita was orphaned when her parents (lion tamers, who raised her in the circus life) died in a fire that consumed their circus two years before Nadja's arrival. That tragic incident robbed her of the ability to speak and left her with an absolute fear of fire. After the death of her parents, Rita was adopted by the Dandelion Troupe (who witnessed the tragedy), and performs on stage with the twin lions Creme (who is white) and Chocolat (who is white like his sibling, but is dyed black by George). Despite time passing, neither of the lions seems mature. With Nadja's help, Rita comes to terms with her trauma and gradually starts talking again.

Applefield Orphanage

A childhood friend of Nadja in the Applefield Orphanage. While Nadja is the type to always run around climbing trees with the boys, Rosemary is more dreamy and would rather watch from afar. Secretly, Rosemary is very unhappy about her status as an orphan, and always likes to fantasize that she is really a beautiful princess who was lost by her family, and who will be rescued any day now (in fact, she at times refers to herself as 'Princess Rosemary'). Nadja played along with Rosemary's dreams by calling Rosemary 'princess' and pretending to be her faithful knight.

When Rosemary turns 13, she, like all Applefield children, has to leave the orphanage and get a job. She works first as the maid of a wealthy family in Spain, and later as a lady-in-waiting for the scheming Herman Preminger, who disguises her as Nadja for his own purposes. Rosemary sees her second job as a way to make her own princess dreams finally come true at any costs even if it hurts Nadja, whom she sees as a traitor after a tragic misunderstanding that happens when they re-meet in Spain, months after they parted.

Rosemary originally is a good-hearted girl with hidden self-worth issues, but she soon develop an extremely nasty and cruel personality after her trust with Nadja shatters, resorting to practically anything to get what she sees as revenge. Believing that Nadja had betrayed her and seeing that her dream is at the grasp of her fingers, Rosemary becomes active and manipulative and at times even reaches levels of madness and scheming that are scary for a 13-year-old girl. Even Herman starts to fear her at one point, since he knows Rosemary is perfectly able and willing to use his weaknesses against him if needed.

In the end, Rosemary recovers her dignity and becomes tired of all the lies and manipulations, realizing that even in achieving victory through them that she is empty and unsatisfied. After speaking to Nadja one last time, she leaves the Preminger manor to "build her own princess castle", in her own words.

Preminger and Colorado clans
Duke Preminger

A well-respected Austrian nobleman. He is the father of Collette and Herman and Nadja's grandfather. He is a powerful and proud man who is very cold and obsessed with family honor. The only people he seems to have a soft spot for are Oscar and Collette.

Raymond Colbert, Nadja's father, worked for the Duke and was fired when Collette asked for permission to marry him, which was refused. As a result, the two eloped. Tragically, Raymond died in an accident while both Collette and Nadja were very sick. The Duke told his retainers to give baby Nadja away to a friend of theirs, Miss Applefield, and tell Collette that her child had perished, thus tricking her into coming back home.

Duke Preminger also hires two private investigators, Rosso and Bianco, to gather information about Nadja's life to see if she is worthy of joining the Preminger clan. It's hinted that he is, in fact, the one who sent Nadja the gown and the diary. Unbeknownst to him, Rosso and Bianco are actually working with his son Herman to eliminate Nadja, making Herman the family heir.

Collette Preminger

Nadja's mother, whose pink gown and diary were sent to Nadja around her 13th birthday. Collette is the eldest daughter of the rich Austrian nobleman Duke Preminger. She eloped with Raymond, a French musician and her piano teacher, when her father fired him after learning they were involved. They lived in poverty but happily in Paris until Raymond died in an accident. Both Nadja and Collette were very ill at the time. The Duke's retainers gave Nadja to the orphanage and told Collette that she had died. The grief-stricken Collette was easily convinced to return home where she has lived a quiet life in the company of her father, second husband (her old friend, Count Waltmüller, a good man who takes care of her very well) and younger brother Herman.

Collette is remarkably similar to Nadja: trusting, good-hearted, stubborn when she wants to be, and slightly klutzy at times. They cross paths several times not knowing that they're mother and daughter until almost the end.

Herman Preminger

Nadja's uncle and son of Duke Preminger, who openly scorned his son after he failed to meet his expectations and almost impoverished the clan with his poor financial decisions. As a result, Herman became a cynical, scheming, money- and power-hungry man who only wants to disprove Nadja's worth as the possible future heiress of the Premingers. He first sends the private detectives Rosso and Bianco to steal Nadja's brooch, and later hires Rosemary to pose as Nadja - a move he would later regret, as Rosemary proves to be less tractable than he thought and whenever he threatens to expose her as a fraud she reminds him he cannot do it without getting himself into bigger trouble for being responsible for this hoax.

Near the end of the series, it's revealed that, as a result of being forced to train in order to one day succeed his father, Herman never had a chance to make friends during his whole childhood and that he resents Nadja because she was chosen over him despite having a happy childhood.

Eventually, Rosso and Bianco start taking advantage of Herman, forcing him to buy stuff for them as he cannot let his father find out about them. As a revenge, when they lock Nadja in Herman's mansion catacombs, Herman locks them in with her. Rosso and Bianco betray Herman and let Nadja escape so that she can expose Herman's plans.  In the end, Herman is arrested and, despite his pleas, his father refuses to pay for his release, disowns him as his son and leaves him imprisoned.

Oscar Colorado

Herman's stepson, son of his wife Hilda. Oscar does not get along with his stepfather, but Collette and the Duke like him. In fact, Oscar's lack of Preminger blood is the only thing keeping him from consideration as the Duke's heir but he does not seem to care about it. He is cares for Collette, who may look to him as a surrogate for Nadja. In fact, the viewer learns of Nadja's true past when Collette is shown telling Oscar her story. Oscar is very protective of his mother Hilda, a sweet and still-young woman trapped in an unhappy marriage with Herman, who abuses her psychologically and once even physically.

Oscar is nice and gentle, but can have a devious side as well. When he attends a ball where Herman expected him to find a rich girl to marry. He instead meets people who tell him that, in order to finance his search for Nadja, Herman borrowed money from Antonio Fabiani and that he now avoids meeting his creditor since he missed the deadline to pay the debt and still does not have enough money to do so. Oscar then arranges a meeting between Antonio and Herman who says that he will be able to repay his debt as soon as he inherits his father's fortune. Antonio suggests discussing that matter with Duke Preminger and Herman asks him not to do so. Oscar tells Antonio he hates guys like him and only arranged the meeting because he intends to use "poison against poison".

Oscar is an heir of the Colorado clan, which owns the mansion where Herman lives, and has enough money to pay Herman's debt but Oscar will not do it unless Herman agrees to leave Hilda and the Colorado mansion forever.

Harcourt clan
Francis Harcourt

He is the son of a wealthy English nobleman, raised by his kind aunt Emma Queensbury after his mother died. Unlike other nobles, he does not believe in social classes and differences, so under the 'noblesse oblige' motto he becomes an active advocate for charity and a sort of kind, sweet guardian angel for the poor. He is extremely focused in this work to the point of being somewhat workaholic, therefore ignoring the affections of girls like his close friend Marianne Hamilton.

Francis and Nadja meet in a charity ball, bonding through their common memories and crossing paths many times as they separately travel through Europe. While still good-hearted, Francis is not as ultra-perfect as he seems, especially since he has serious self-worth problems regarding both his own persona and someone he dearly loves, as well as heavy guilt trips that arise when he sees that his good intentions aren't enough to make the poor happier. He and Keith fall in love with Nadja, but he is aware that Nadja's affections are for Keith and accepts it. In episode 44, Nadja is forced to choose between Keith or Francis. In the end of that episode, she chooses Francis. However, in episode 50 when she is talking with her mother, she talks about how she is "has not come to recognize her own feelings anymore." This along with a scene later on in the episode when the Harcourt twins stated that they will "play fair" for the love of Nadja concludes that Nadjas love interest has actually not been chosen.
Keith Harcourt (a.k.a. the Black Rose)

The Black Rose is a dashing, handsome and mysterious thief who steals from the rich and gives the stolen wealth to the poor, since he believes that all the wealthy people are frivolous and self-centered. He is very well loved by the crowd, and famous among the journalists. His trademarks are his black costume with cape, mask, and calling card that he uses to taunt his future victims. He crosses paths with Nadja several times during her travels with the Dandelion Troupe; she is at first enraged by his dry wit and exploits, but later learns his motives and starts to empathize more with him.

The Black Rose's true identity is revealed mid-way in the series. His true name is Keith Harcourt, and he is the older twin brother of Francis, who walked away from his family after he finished his schooling at age 15. He shares his twin's desire to help the poor, but is far more cynical and disenchanted, since he thinks that 'noblesse oblige' is insufficient. The death of their mother had an influence; while the more innocent Francis saw only Countess Harcourt's kinder side, Keith saw her secret unhappiness upon being a bird in a gilded cage. Nadja's love of freedom touches him so much that he appoints himself as her protector after he rescues her from Rosso and Bianco. Like his brother, he falls in love with Nadja as he protects her and is drawn to her personality. In episode 44, Nadja is forced to choose between Keith or Francis. In the end of that episode, she chooses Francis. However, in episode 50 when she is talking with her mother, she talks about how she is "has not come to recognize her own feelings anymore." This along with a scene later on in the episode when the Harcourt twins stated that they will "play fair" for the love of Nadja concludes that Nadjas love interest has actually not been chosen.

Others
Harvey Livingston

A friendly, lanky and talented American journalist who works for a French newspaper, and due to his work he travels through Europe searching for the most outrageous news. He is one of the first people to give Nadja serious hints about her true origins; he examines her brooch during their meeting in Italy and, noting its craftsmanship, deduces that she is of very noble origin and warns her of how serious a matter it could be.

Despite his lazy outlook, Harvey is extremely serious when it comes to his work. He also has a very strong sense of justice and greatly admires the thief Black Rose; one of his most cherished dreams is to interview him. He has looked after his little brother, T.J., ever since they were orphaned.

Marianne Hamilton

Marianne is the daughter of another English noble clan, who has known Francis Harcourt since childhood and has loved him since then. In fact, the Hamilton and Harcourt families were planning to engage Marianne and Francis, but Nadja's appearance disrupts these plans.

While she makes clear to Nadja that she will not give Francis up to her and says that Nadja is better off with Keith, upon hearing her family plea Marianne accepts to help Nadja and Francis to prove Nadja's bond to the Premingers, wanting to see if she really is who she claims to be, and even saying that if Nadja truly is a Preminger, she will cancel her engagement to Francis.

Marianne is painted as a morally ambiguous character with both good (focused, honest and straightforward) and bad (manipulative and very possessive of Francis) traits. She is less malicious than Rosemary and Herman, but still not completely good. Despite her selfishness, she seems to truly care for Francis, as seen in a scene with Nadja where Marianne blurts out that Nadja has Keith and the Dandelion Troupe while she only has Francis to hold on to, and runs away from Nadja almost in tears.

Antonio Fabiani

Cynical and greedy, Antonio was raised by his widowed mother, Irma, in the slums of Venice. He left home at age 16 and gradually grew up into a disenchanted, selfish, cold businessman, who apparently won his wealth through extremely shady deals, which may or may not have included scams.

Antonio and Nadja have butted heads several times. Nadja met him when he was courting a rich girl who rejected him and he tried to silence her with money, which Nadja angrily refused. She continued to think poorly of Antonio until she learned of his past from Irma. It's later revealed that Herman Preminger owed him a large sum of money (Herman borrowed the money so he could bribe his father's detectives). Duke Preminger paid off the debt and then disowned his son.

Antonio seems to be somewhat of a ladies' man, going out with Sylvie once in a while (it's hinted that he occasionally helps the Dandelion Troupe with their finances) and openly courting the heiress Julietta, with a notable lack of success.

Fernando Gonzales

Fernando Gonzales is the son of a wealthy Spanish noble family, and all his life he has been pampered and spoiled. This resulted in Fernando's petty, malicious personality. Fernando finds Nadja very attractive (in a snotty rich kid way) but instead of being nice to her, he bosses her around and publicly humiliates her by forcing her to attend a masked ball as an entertainer, and later blackmailing her into attending another ball at his own house. His family also happened to employ Rosemary after she left the orphanage. Rosemary has a huge crush on Fernando, but his mean attitude towards her and his "niceness" towards Nadja is one of the things that causes Rosemary's betrayal.

Raphael, the troubadour
Voiced by: Kouji Yamamoto
A kind-hearted and wise man, he's a traveling musician and a long-time friend of the Dandelion Troupe. Once he and a young noblewoman eloped, but she was taken ill and died. Since then, Raphael sings beautiful love songs but, believing it's his fault that his wife died and not wishing to inflict such pain on anybody else, refuses to become involved with another woman. Sylvie knows his sad history and has fallen deeply in love with him despite knowing that her love will never be requited. He counsels Nadja on occasion, telling her that she has beautiful wings.

Christian Strand
Christian is a kind and klutzy Egyptologist who keeps bumping into Nadja. He develops feelings for Nadja, but due to her involvement with the Harcourt twins, he never really gets to tell her. Christian was a street child with a great love of knowledge; a kind professor saw him in the Museum where he worked and took him in as his pupil and, later, heir. Several years previously, Christian's landlady worked for Duke Preminger, and was one of the people who gave the baby Nadja to Miss Applefield. She also helps the Duke send Collette's trunk to Nadja at the orphanage.

Leonardo Capinale
A young noble with a good heart. He is a womanizer who often shows up with different women in tow and often meets Nadja, calling her My Little Rosebud despite her complaints. Nonetheless, he is a frequent ally to Nadja and her search for his mother. He is engaged to a woman named Julietta since birth who has feelings for him but he often plays around because he wants the desire to be free before he marries.

Thierry
A close friend of Leonardo who helps him assist Nadja in searching for her mother and is his close confidant.

TJ
Harvey's younger brother who has a small boyish crush on Nadja and a rivalry/friendship with Kennosuke. He looks up to Harvey.

Oliver
One of Nadja's friends from her orphanage. After the orphanage was burned down, his master from his previous job in London found him a factory job in France. He has a crush on her and tries several times to confess (especially in episode 11) but in the end fails and reaffirms their relationship as family. He currently works under a saddle maker.

Julietta
A noblewoman and friend of Nadia. She is Leonardo's fiancée due to an arranged marriage by their parents decided at their birth. She is a kind gentle woman who has loved Leonardo but he initially did not return her affection and also flirted with many women, saying he didn't want to be tied down. Antonio later pursued her to obtain her social status but later grew to fall for her. Leonardo then began to see her as a woman. She meets with Nadia in episode 44 and gives advice on who to choose between Keith and Francis. Julietta herself says she chose the person she fell for not the one who fell for her.

Media

Anime
Produced by Asahi Television Broadcasting Corporation, ADK and Toei Animation, the series is directed by Takuya Igarashi, with Tomoko Konparu handling series composition, Kazuto Nakazawa designing the characters and Keiichi Oku composing the music. It is available on DVD (in Japanese) containing two to three episodes each. It has also been released on French-Canadian R1 DVD by Imavision in two boxsets. It has also received 2 English-language compilation dubbed movies from William Winckler Productions and Toei with a planned DVD release. The opening theme is "Nadja!!" by Minako Honda, and the ending theme is "Que Sera, Sera" by Ami Koshimizu.

Novel
A sequel novel, set three years after the anime, titled , was announced on August 3, 2017, and released on September 12, 2017. Tomoko Konparu, the anime writer, wrote the novel and Kazuto Nakazawa, the anime character designer, returned to draw the novel's cover art and other illustrations.

See also
Noblesse oblige, the motto of Francis Harcourt.

References

External links 

Toei Animation's Official Ashita no Nadja page
 Toei Animation's Official Ashita no Nadja page

2003 anime television series debuts
2003 manga
Animated television series about orphans
Animated television series about twins
Asahi Broadcasting Corporation original programming
Fictional adoptees
Fictional nobility
Works about entertainers
Television shows set in Europe
Television series set in the 20th century
Historical anime and manga
Shōjo manga
Toei Animation television
TV Asahi original programming
Anime with original screenplays